The Best of Nikki Webster is the fourth album by Australian singer Nikki Webster released in Australia on 29 November 2004 (see 2004 in music) by Gotham Records. It is a compilation album: CD 1 is a collection of Webster's hits from 2000 to 2004, while the DVD is a collection of her music videos and live performances. It reached the ARIA Albums Chart top 100.

Track listing
CD
 "Strawberry Kisses" – 3:34
 "We'll Be One" – 4:13
 "24/7 (Crazy 'Bout Your Smile)" – 3:17
 "The Best Days" – 3:38
 "Over the Rainbow" – 3:02
 "I Wanna Be Like You (the Monkey Song)"  – 2:50
 "I Sing for You"  – 3:36
 "Depend on Me"  – 4:10
 "Let's Dance"  – 3:58
 "Something More Beautiful"  – 3:32
 "Follow Your Heart"  – 3:51
 "Under Southern Skies"  – 2:26
 "Dancing in the Street"  – 3:53
 "Don’t Give Up"  – 3:45

DVD
 "Strawberry Kisses" – 3:37
 "We'll Be One" – 4:10
 "24/7 (Crazy 'Bout Your Smile)" – 3:22
 "The Best Days" – 3:54
 "I Wanna Be Like You (the Monkey Song)"  – 2:51
 "Depend on Me"  – 3:57
 "Let's Dance"  – 4:00
 "Something More Beautiful"  – 3:32
 "Dancing in the Street"  – 3:46
 "Under Southern Skies" (live at Australia Day Concert 2004) – 3:33
 "Let's Dance" (live at Australia Day Concert 2004) – 4:10
 "Something More Beautiful" (behind the scenes)  – 2:37
 "Dancing in the Street" (behind the scenes)  – 3:38
 Photo Gallery – 2:36
 "Follow Your Heart" (documentary) – 4:57

Charts

References

2004 greatest hits albums
Nikki Webster albums
2004 video albums
Music video compilation albums
Gotham Records compilation albums
Gotham Records video albums